Derek Price may refer to:

 Derek J. de Solla Price (1922–1983), physicist, historian of science, and information scientist
 Derek Price (American football) (born 1972), American football player
 Derek Price, character in Fireman Sam
 Derek Price (judge), judge of the Supreme Court of NSW

See also
Derek Price/Rod Webster Prize, awarded by the History of Science Society